Epic Mickey is an action-adventure platform video game developed by Junction Point Studios and published by Disney Interactive Studios for the Wii. It was released in November 2010 in North America and PAL territories and August 2011 in Japan by Nintendo. The game focuses on Mickey Mouse, who accidentally damages a world created by Yen Sid for forgotten characters and concepts and must save it. The game features Oswald the Lucky Rabbit, a character created by Walt Disney and Ub Iwerks and originally owned by Universal Pictures; The Walt Disney Company gained ownership of the character in 2006. The game marks the first time that Mickey and Oswald appeared together.

Epic Mickey was part of an effort by Disney to re-brand the Mickey Mouse character by placing less emphasis on his pleasant, cheerful side and reintroducing the more mischievous and adventurous sides of his personality, depicting him as an epic hero. It was directed by Warren Spector, who collaborated with Walt Disney Animation Studios on the project. The game was announced in October 2009, and released in November 2010. The game received mixed reviews from critics. Successors to the game include Epic Mickey 2: The Power of Two and Epic Mickey: Power of Illusion.

Gameplay
Epic Mickey is primarily a platform game and allows players to use their own solutions for getting through the levels. Epic Mickey features a morality system similar to games like Infamous, Spider-Man: Web of Shadows, and Shadow the Hedgehog. Different alliances, side-quests and power-ups are made available depending on the choices of the player. It is also possible to avoid mini-bosses if specific actions are taken. The in-game currency (E-tickets) are important to these boss fights.

The game's key feature is a magic paintbrush, which Mickey wields, that has the ability to draw or erase objects using paint and thinner. For example, obstacles can be erased from physical existence with thinner and then restored with paint, or enemies can be befriended by revitalizing them with paint or destroyed completely using the thinner. The two fluids have little effect on "Beetleworx" enemies, which require being taken down physically. Mickey is also able to materialize objects from sketches, which have various effects. Two of the three sketches, the watch and the television, slow down time and distract enemies, respectively. Both fluids have limited reserves, adding a strategic element to gameplay: players must compromise between making various tasks harder or easier to accomplish. However, the fluids automatically but slowly refill, and power-ups that quickly replenish the fluids are available in certain areas. Mickey can also find collectable pins in Wasteland. Most are bronze, silver, or gold pins, but some are special: for example, the "Art Appreciator" or "Mean Street" pin. Another thing that is useful in the game is a type of currency called E-tickets.  These can be given or discovered. They are used to buy quest items, concept art, pins, health refills, or paint or thinner refills.

To travel between sections of the Wasteland, Mickey traverses 2D side-scrolling levels based on his cartoon shorts (with three being based on Oswald shorts; Trolley Troubles, Great Guns!, and Oh What a Knight and two being based on Sleeping Beauty and Fantasia), such as Steamboat Willie and Clock Cleaners.

Synopsis

Setting
The game is set in the Wasteland, a pen-and-paper stylized world, created in the game's narrative by the sorcerer Yen Sid, as a place for "forgotten things", namely disused or obscure Disney characters. It is physically inspired by Disneyland, and appears as an intricate model in Yen Sid's workshop. However, Mickey Mouse's fiddling with Yen Sid's paintbrush causes mass damage to the model, turning Wasteland into a post-apocalyptic landscape. The land is tormented by the Shadow Blot, a monstrous being which Mickey accidentally created using the brush and is loosely based on the Phantom Blot, an antagonist to Mickey in the comic strips created by Floyd Gottfredson, as well as the Mad Doctor.

Wasteland is split into several locations based on the various areas from Disneyland and other Disney theme parks. Mean Street is based on Main Street, U.S.A., where Horace Horsecollar and Pete live, though other incarnations of the latter appear through the game. The Gremlin Village is inspired by Fantasyland, based primarily around It's A Small World. The attraction's iconic clock tower serves as the game's first boss encounter. Mickeyjunk Mountain is based on the Matterhorn Bobsleds, and is covered in Mickey Mouse toys and merchandise. Other locations include Bog Easy, based on New Orleans Square, which is home to the Lonesome Manor, based on The Haunted Mansion, Ventureland, based on Adventureland, Tomorrow City, based on Tomorrowland, and OsTown, based on Mickey's Toontown, where Clarabelle Cow lives.

Story
Mickey Mouse, out of curiosity, enters Yen Sid's workshop through a mirror in his house and discovers the model of a world resembling Disneyland that Yen Sid created for things that have been forgotten and the tool used to create it - the magic paintbrush. Fiddling with the brush to make his own self-portrait, Mickey accidentally creates the Shadow Blot. Panicking, Mickey quickly tries to erase the monster by throwing thinner onto it, but spills more paint on the model in the process. Upon seeing Yen Sid approaching, Mickey quickly tries to clean up the mess, but in his haste, spills thinner onto the paint spillage as he flees back to his house, while the Blot, having survived Mickey's attempt to destroy it, enters through a portal created by the paint and thinner mixture, taking a bottle of thinner with it, and takes control of the ruined world from its first resident, Oswald the Lucky Rabbit.

After many decades of fame following the incident, Mickey had forgotten all about it until what appears to be the Blot enters his home through the mirror and abducts him into the ruined forgotten world, now named by this time as the Wasteland. Oswald all the while had his will and mind twisted from years of hiding and his jealousy of Mickey's rise to fame, unaware of the enigmatic Mad Doctor, who was formerly loyal to Oswald before siding with the Blot, and the Blot's plan to steal Mickey's heart, which they plan to use to escape Wasteland as the world's inhabitants lose their own hearts when they are forgotten and they are unable to leave because of this. However, Mickey frees himself before they can succeed and scares off the Blot with Yen Sid's brush, which had also fallen into Wasteland, forcing the Mad Doctor to flee. Oswald, who was spying on them, also flees, leaving Mickey to deal with the Mad Doctor's now-hostile mechanical arm. 

Gus, the leader of the Gremlins, who primarily serve as mechanics in Wasteland, helps Mickey disable the mechanical arm and escape out of Dark Beauty Castle, which the Mad Doctor was using as a hideout. Mickey also discovers that he was soaked with some of the Blot's ink. During his journey through the Wasteland, Mickey is guided by Gus and becomes armed with the brush, which allows Mickey to spray paint and thinner that can be used to erase or paint in toon objects and fight Blotlings, the Blot's spawn, and Beetleworx, the Mad Doctor's evil creations. After traveling through the gremlins' village, he confronts the Clock Tower, now driven insane after hearing the song "It's a Small World" for years. He makes it to Mean Street, where Wasteland's inhabitants mainly reside. There, he learns that Wasteland was once a peaceful place until an event called the Thinner Disaster occurred, followed by the arrival of the Blot. After locating Oswald at his sanctuary in Mickeyjunk Mountain, he reluctantly agrees to help Mickey escape. To do so, they go to the Moonliner Rocket at Tomorrow City, but Oswald discovers that the Mad Doctor has stolen essential parts from it to use for his evil plans, so Mickey goes to collect them. He retrieves the first part after defeating the corrupted Petetronic, an incarnation of Pete based on Sark from Tron, the next after defeating an animatronic version of Captain Hook in Ventureland, and confronts the Mad Doctor in the Lonesome Manor. After defeating him, it is revealed that he turned himself into an animatronic, which will allow him to survive the Blot's revolt before he is sent flying after Gus removes the last rocket part from his hovercraft. After acquiring all the parts, Oswald has Mickey help repel a Blot attack on Mickeyjunk Mountain.

Once the threat is neutralized, it is revealed to Mickey that the Blot that he had just battled, along with all of the Blotlings Mickey had encountered, were only drippings of the real Blot. Oswald reveals that he and his girlfriend, Ortensia, attempted to seal the Blot away in the bottle of thinner from Yen Sid's workshop (the same bottle that fell into Wasteland and was the cause of the Thinner Disaster), but Ortensia was blighted by the monster in the process and entered an inert state. When Oswald attempts to officially be friends with Mickey, Mickey confesses to him that he was the cause of the Blot's existence and the Thinner Disaster. Oswald loses his temper and accidentally damages the cork sealing the bottle shut, allowing the Blot to escape from its imprisonment. The Blot captures Oswald and Gus and threatens to kill them if Mickey does not allow it to take his heart. Mickey yields his heart to the monster, who then lets Oswald and Gus go and proceeds to further destroy Wasteland using ink tentacles called bloticles to absorb its paint before moving on to Mickey's world to wreak havoc there.

After getting rid of the bloticles, Mickey, Oswald and Gus attempt to use the rocket (which is now fixed) to reach the monster, but end up crashing the rocket into Dark Beauty Castle after it absorbs its paint. The group make their way to the top of the castle, where they defeat the Blot's forces before it captures Oswald and Gus, forcing Mickey to enter the monster's body to save them. The three successfully manage to destroy the Blot with a paint-laden firework display from the castle and Mickey regains his heart before everyone is sent flying. Oswald and Ortensia land in Mean Street while Mickey is sent through a portal that takes him out of Wasteland and back to Yen Sid's workshop. With the Blot destroyed, Wasteland begins regenerating and Oswald reunites with the restored Ortensia. As Mickey returns home, Yen Sid enchants the mirror to show Mickey the positive outcomes or consequences of his major choices in the game and allow him to communicate with Oswald one last time, the duo now bonding as brothers. Afterwards, Yen Sid seals the mirror to prevent Mickey from re-entering his workshop and causing any more mischief.

Not long after the mirror is sealed, Mickey discovers that he still has some of the Blot's ink in him, leaving the possibility he may still be able to reach Wasteland.

Development

The creative development team at Buena Vista Games formed the original concept for Epic Mickey in 2003. When the concept was pitched to Bob Iger, then-president and COO, he lamented that Disney didn't own the rights to Oswald the Lucky Rabbit and could not produce the game. Upon becoming CEO, he made it a goal to put Oswald under Disney's ownership. His chance came in 2006 when television sportscaster Al Michaels expressed interest in joining NBC (which had merged with Oswald owner Universal Pictures by this time) to call play-by-play for Sunday Night Football, even though he had just signed a long-term deal with Disney-owned ESPN to continue on Monday Night Football. Iger initiated a trade with NBC Universal that would allow Michaels to be released from his contract in exchange for the rights to Oswald and other minor assets. Disney Interactive Studios was unable to secure a developer for the game until 2007 when Disney acquired Junction Point Studios, Warren Spector's company. Around 130 people from Junction Point worked on the game. Another 150 people contributed to the project from around the world.

The game was originally intended to be released for the PlayStation 3 and Xbox 360 and its name was its working title. Development on the Wii started in 2008. When the idea of a Wii port of the game was raised, Spector replied that a straight Wii port would not be viable, remarking that many of the "design ideas just won't work on the Wii, we need to give the Wii its dues". Graham Hopper of Disney Interactive then suggested dropping the development of the PS3 and Xbox 360 versions completely, and instead releasing it solely on the Wii.<ref>{{cite web |url=http://www.joystiq.com/2009/10/28/epic-mickey-was-originally-an-epic-pc-ps3-and-xbox-360-game/ |title=Epic Mickey was originally an epic PC, PS3 & 360 game -- Joystiq |last1=Fletcher |first1=JC |date=October 28, 2009 |work=Joystiq |publisher=Weblogs, Inc. |access-date=April 7, 2010 |archive-url=https://web.archive.org/web/20091230001515/http://www.joystiq.com/2009/10/28/epic-mickey-was-originally-an-epic-pc-ps3-and-xbox-360-game/ |archive-date=December 30, 2009 |url-status=dead |df=mdy-all}}</ref>

Compared to the Kingdom Hearts series, a similar video game franchise created by Japanese video game company Square Enix, which combined modern-day Disney characters with their own Final Fantasy characters, Epic Mickey emphasizes retro-vintage and long-lost Disney characters that were created much earlier, and draws more plot elements from the film Fantasia, rather than Final Fantasy; in Kingdom Hearts II, a location in the game was based on the 1920s Steamboat Willie cartoon, but other than that, the rest of the game took its cast from more recently created characters.

Mickey receives a character redesign in this game, which attempts to give him a "retro" look, and the game uses an animation engine to replicate the stretchy athleticism of cartoons. The 2D cinematics were created by Powerhouse Animation Studios, Inc, and the game utilizes Emergent Game Technologies' Gamebryo Engine. Warren Spector has stated that Epic Mickey was planned as a trilogy. An early idea for the game was for Mickey to adopt an angrier look when he was played in the "scrapper" manner; this idea was dropped after Spector decided it changed Mickey too much from people's perceptions of the character. Mickey looks more smudged instead.

Marvel Comics released a prequel comic based on Epic Mickey, titled Disney's Epic Mickey: Tales of the Wasteland. It focuses on Mickey's half-brother Oswald the Lucky Rabbit, and gives some insight on what the Wasteland was like before Mickey's appearance and the thinner disaster. Initially distributed on Disney's Digicomics platform for iOS products, a print version released in late-August 2011. An art book, The Art of Epic Mickey, was also released in September 2011. A U.S.-exclusive Epic Mickey Collector's Edition was announced that includes special packaging, special behind-the-scenes DVD, Mickey vinyl figure, a Wii Remote skin, and Wii console skins.

The game was leaked by warez groups weeks before its official release date. Epic Mickey marks Oswald's second appearance in video games after Férias Frustradas do Pica-Pau (released in Brazil only).

The music was composed by American composer James Dooley. In addition to his original works arranged versions of Disney music appear throughout the game, which in turn were recreations of older Disney cartoons. X-Play later named it "Best Soundtrack of 2010". Dooley's score was released digitally via iTunes and Amazon on December 21, 2010.

Promotion

Writer Peter David, who in 2010 was an exclusive writer for Disney-owned Marvel Comics, wrote a graphic novel adaptation of Epic Mickey, and a prequel digicomic, Disney's Epic Mickey: Tales of Wasteland.Gonzalez, Annette. "Peter David To Pen Epic Mickey Graphic Novel, Digicomic", Game Informer, July 25, 2010 Disney also promoted the release of the game with a launch party at the Times Square Disney Store in Manhattan on November 30, 2010, the day the game was released. Present at the party was designer Warren Spector, Peter David, and actors Jennifer Grey and Kyle Massey, who had recently completed the eleventh season of the U.S. Dancing with the Stars, which is broadcast on the Disney-owned ABC.

ReceptionEpic Mickey received "mixed or average reviews" according to review aggregator Metacritic.

IGN gave it a score of 8/10, criticizing its camera, control issues and lack of voice acting, but praised its charm, story, art design, and lasting appeal for the players. Video game talk show Good Games two presenters gave the game a 6 and 7 out of 10. They compared the paintbrush abilities to that of the water jet pack from Super Mario Sunshine and found it frustrating how the levels reset back to their original state after leaving. On a positive note, they said it "isn't as 'dark' or 'adult' as the hype made it out to be... I guess it is a kid's game after all, but at least it's an intelligent one. It doesn't come anywhere near the complexity and fun of something like Super Mario Sunshine, which I think it borrows some ideas from". Shirley Chase from GameZone complimented the game on its usage of Disney history but added that the game had numerous flaws saying: "For all of its good points, Disney Epic Mickey does have some glaring flaws, which can make the game feel like a chore. The most noticeable problem is the camera, which will lead to more cheap deaths than anything else". In a review for GamesRadar, Chris Antista who began the article as an admitted "diehard Disney dork", praised it as a "thoroughly heartwarming salute to Disney" and that he hasn't "fallen so head over heels with the look, feel, and play of a third-person platformer since the original Banjo-Kazooie". G4TV also named it "Best Wii Game". Giant Bomb gave a negative review with 2/5 stars saying: "Nevermind these heightened expectations, though: even on its own merits, Epic Mickey is a platformer that feels about a generation behind, though one with just enough flashes of inspiration to keep you constantly aware of its wasted potential".

In its opening weekend, Epic Mickey failed to reach the UK Top 40 and even the Wii Top 10 sales charts after its November 26 UK release. On November 30, 2010, the release date in North America, the game was completely sold out on the Disney Store website by the afternoon. The game sold 1.3 million copies its first month. , the game sold 2 million copies in North America and Europe combined.

Sequel

In August 2011, Destructoid posted an article that speculated that a sequel, Epic Mickey 2, is in development and showed possible box art for the game. These rumours were further encouraged when Disney France and Warren Spector invited the French media to an "epic project" taking place on March 27, 2012. Nintendo Power magazine also commented on the rumour, stating that their April 2012 issue would include a "top-secret" title preview, with the preview for the issue showing a cropped-down picture of Oswald The Lucky Rabbit. Gametrailers.com also stated that their March 22, 2012 episode would include a "world-exclusive preview of Warren Spector's new epic adventure" and that it would be "notably significant". Warren Spector himself also commented on the game's development, revealing that he had "a team of over 700 people working on the sequel". Following this, on March 20, 2012, the official French Nintendo magazine posted a comment on Twitter, revealing that Disney had plans to create a companion to the main sequel for the 3DS, under the name Epic Mickey: Power of Illusion.

Warren Spector officially confirmed the rumours, revealing the sequel's title to be Epic Mickey: Power of Two''. Spector also directly addressed the camera issues that reviewers criticised in the first game, stating that "they'll be working on it until the day we ship the second game. There have been over 1,000 specific changes made to the camera. Our goal is that you will not have to touch the manual camera controls even once to play through the main story path of this game". Spector also revealed that the game was to include voice acting and musical numbers, both of which were absent in the first game. Spector said: "I'm such a geek about musicals, I love the co-op and next-gen stuff, but for me, when a character breaks into song, which they do on a regular basis in this game, it's magic". Spector also commented on the sequel's co-op features: "It's drop-in, drop-out co-op, you can sit down at any time with a friend who is playing as Mickey, and you can take control of Oswald. If you're playing as a single player, Oswald will be there every second of the game. He's not just a multiplayer character. He's a helper, whether you're playing alone or with a friend or family member". Wasteland itself will feature old areas ruined by earthquakes and other natural disasters, as well as new areas such as one based on Disneyland's Frontierland.

It was released on Wii, PlayStation 3, Xbox 360, Microsoft Windows, PlayStation Vita, and Wii U.

References

External links
Official U.S. website
Official UK website

 
2010 video games
3D platform games
Action-adventure games
Crossover video games
Disney video games
Fantasy video games
Gamebryo games
Metafictional video games
Mickey Mouse video games
Video games about parallel universes
Post-apocalyptic video games
Single-player video games
Steampunk video games
Video game franchises introduced in 2010
Video games developed in the United States
Video games about rabbits and hares
Video games scored by James Dooley (composer)
Video games set in amusement parks
Walt Disney Records soundtracks
Wii games
Wii-only games
Video games directed by Warren Spector
Video games with alternate endings